Diplostephium juniperinum is a species of flowering plant in the family Asteraceae. It is found only in Ecuador. Its natural habitat is subtropical or tropical moist montane forests. It is threatened by habitat loss. Its essential oil exhibits anticholinesterase effect.

References

juniperinum
Flora of Ecuador
Endangered plants
Taxonomy articles created by Polbot